Kuyantayevo (Quyantaw) is a rural locality (a selo) in Bekeshevsky Selsoviet, Baymaksky District, Bashkortostan, Russia. The population was 933 as of 2010. There are 16 streets.

Geography 
Kuyantayevo is located 14 km northwest of Baymak (the district's administrative centre) by road. Karatal is the nearest rural locality.

References 

Rural localities in Baymaksky District